Pseudorhabdosynochus serrani is a species of diplectanid monogenean parasitic on the gills of a fish. It was described in 1953 by Satyu Yamaguti as Diplectanum serrani  and later  transferred to the genus Pseudorhabdosynochus. The species has been redescribed in 2005.

Description 

Pseudorhabdosynochus serrani is a small monogenean, 0.3-0.4 mm in length. The species has the general characteristics of other species of Pseudorhabdosynochus, with a flat body and a posterior haptor, which is the organ by which the monogenean attaches itself to the gill of is host. The haptor bears two squamodiscs, one ventral and one dorsal.
The sclerotized male copulatory organ, or "quadriloculate organ", has the shape of a bean with four internal chambers, as in other species of Pseudorhabdosynochus.
The vagina includes a sclerotized part, which is a complex structure.

Etymology
The etymology of the specific epithet is not explained in the original description  but obviously refers to the genus of the host fish, Serranus.

Hosts and localities
The type-locality is off Makassar (Indonesia), and the type-host is an unnamed fish of the genus Serranus. The species has been recorded from wild and maricultured grouper, Epinephelus coioides and Epinephelus bruneus, in Daya Bay, South China Sea.

References

External links 

Diplectanidae
Animals described in 1953
Fauna of Indonesia
Fauna of China